Zaccaria de Moris (died 1517) was a Roman Catholic prelate who served as Bishop of Terracina, Priverno e Sezze (1510–1517).

Biography
On 13 May 1510, Zaccaria de Moris was appointed by Pope Julius II as Bishop of Terracina, Priverno e Sezze.
He served as Bishop of Terracina, Priverno e Sezze until his death, perhaps in 1517.

References

External links and additional sources
 (for Chronology of Bishops) 
 (for Chronology of Bishops) 

16th-century Italian Roman Catholic bishops
Bishops appointed by Pope Julius II
1517 deaths